Arkoola is a genus of fungus in the family Venturiaceae. This is a monotypic genus, containing the single species Arkoola nigra.

See also
 List of soybean diseases

References

Venturiaceae
Monotypic Dothideomycetes genera
Soybean diseases